Glassy Mountain may refer to: 
Glassy Mountain (South Carolina), a mountain near Pickens, South Carolina
Glassy Mountain (Georgia), a mountain in Chattahoochee National Forest, Georgia